Loránd Szilágyi (born 25 February 1987) is a Romanian football player.

References

External links
 

1985 births
Living people
Sportspeople from Târgu Mureș
Romanian footballers
Association football defenders
Liga I players
Liga II players
Liga III players
ASA 2013 Târgu Mureș players
CS Gaz Metan Mediaș players
Nemzeti Bajnokság I players
Nemzeti Bajnokság III players
Budapest Honvéd FC players
Cigánd SE players
Romanian expatriate footballers
Expatriate footballers in Hungary
Romanian expatriate sportspeople in Hungary